Detransition is the cessation or reversal of a transgender identification or gender transition, whether by social, legal, or medical means. Some individuals detransition on a temporary basis.

Estimates of the rate at which detransitioning occurs vary, although it is rare. Reasons for detransitioning also vary, and may include health-related concerns, finding that transition did not alleviate gender dysphoria, an unaffirming social environment, financial concerns, the realization that the individual's gender dysphoria was a manifestation of another condition, or political, religious, or philosophical disagreements with the transgender rights movement.

Academic research into detransition is underdeveloped. Professional interest in the phenomenon has been met with contention, and some scholars have argued there is censorship around the topic. In politics and popular culture, detransitioning is a contentious topic. Some who detransition report feeling a loss of support by their LGBT friends and family. Various sides in the debate over detransitioning have reported harassment from other individuals. Some people regret detransitioning and choose to retransition. Some organizations with ties to conversion therapy have used detransition narratives to push anti-transgender agendas and legislation.

Background and terminology

Transition is the process of a transgender person changing their gender presentation and/or sex characteristics to accord with their internal sense of gender identity. Transition commonly involves social changes (such as clothing, personal name, and pronouns), legal changes (such as changes in legal name and legal gender), and medical/physical changes (such as hormone replacement therapy and gender-affirming surgery).

Detransition (sometimes called retransition) is the process of halting or reverting a transgender identification or gender transition. Like transition, detransition is not a single event. Methods of detransitioning can vary greatly among individuals, and can involve changes to one's gender expression, social identity, identity documents, and/or anatomy. Desistance is a general term for any cessation, and it is commonly applied specifically to the cessation of transgender identity or gender dysphoria. Those who undertake detransition are known as detransitioners. Detransition is sometimes associated with transition regret, but regret and detransition do not always coincide.

The term detransition is controversial within the transgender community. According to Turban et al., this is because, as with the word transition, it carries an "incorrect implication that gender identity is contingent upon gender affirmation processes". The term has also been conflated with transition regret, and thereby become associated with a politically motivated push to restrict the access of transgender people to transition-related healthcare.

Occurrence
Formal studies of detransition have been few in number, of disputed quality, and politically controversial. Frequency estimates for detransition and desistance vary greatly, with notable differences in terminology and methodology. Detransition is more common in the earlier stages of transition, particularly before surgeries. 

The number of detransitioners is unknown, with estimates generally ranging from less than 1% to as many as 8%. Studies which give low estimates have been criticised for their "serious limitations", such as short follow-up, high or unclear rates of loss to follow up, reliance on individuals returning to secondary care clinics reporting transition regret or seeking reversal procedures, (a study of 100 detransitioners found that only 24% of respondents informed their clinicians that they had detransitioned), errors, non-replicability, as well as other issues. Research suggesting higher rates of detransition also has flaws, however, meaning that detransition rates can be under-reported or over-reported.

Studies have reported higher rates of desistance among prepubertal children. A 2016 review of 10 prospective follow-up studies from childhood to adolescence found desistance rates ranging from 61% to 98%, with evidence suggesting that they might be less than 85% more generally. These studies have been criticized on the grounds that they include cases as 'desistance' where the child met the criteria for gender identity disorder as defined in the DSM-III or DSM-IV, although some would likely not have met the updated criteria for gender dysphoria in the DSM-5 (2013). Initial diagnostic criteria for gender dysphoria were only introduced in the DSM-III (1980), so earlier research on desistance rates might report inflated numbers of desistance due to the inclusion of gender-nonconforming children without gender dysphoria. Additionally, two studies of childhood desistance were based on data from a Canadian clinic which closed in 2015 after allegations that they engaged in conversion therapy by discouraging social transition; such clinical practices may also lead to inflated rates of reported desistance. Most childhood desisters go on to identify as cisgender and gay, bisexual, or lesbian.

A 2019 poster presentation examined the records of 3398 patients who attended a UK gender identity clinic between August 2016 and August 2017. Davies and colleagues searched for assessment reports with keywords related to regret or detransition. They identified 16 individuals (0.47%) who expressed regret or had detransitioned.  Of those 16, 3 (0.09%) had detransitioned permanently. 10 (0.29%) had detransitioned temporarily, to later retransition. A 2019 clinical assessment found that 9.4% of patients with adolescent-emerging gender dysphoria either ceased wishing to pursue medical interventions or no longer felt that their gender identity was incongruent with their assigned sex at birth within an eighteen-month period. A 2021 study examining the case notes of 175 adults discharged from a UK gender identity clinic between September 2017 and August 2018 found that 12 (6.9%) met the researchers' criteria for detransitioningthat is, they returned to living as their assigned gender. Six individuals were found to have experiences that "overlap" with detransitioners, but were not counted as such for this study due to displaying "gender identity confusion" during treatment. Another study from a UK primary care practice found that 12.2% of those who had started hormonal treatments either detransitioned or documented regret, while a total of 20% stopped the treatments for a wider range of reasons. An April 2022 study found that 284 individuals out of a total of 952 (29.8%) had stopped hormone therapy treatments.

Those who undergo gender-affirming surgery have very low rates of detransition or transition regret. A 2005 Dutch study included 162 adults who received sex reassignment surgery, 126 of whom participated in follow-up assessments one to four years after surgery. Two individuals expressed regret at follow-up, only one of whom said that they would not transition again if given the opportunity. The remaining 124 out of 126 (98%) expressed no regrets about transitioning. A 2021 meta-analysis of 27 studies concluded that "there is an extremely low prevalence of regret in transgender patients after [gender-affirmation surgery]". In a January 2023 study of 1989 individuals who had undergone sex reassignment surgery, 6 individuals (0.3%) requested a reversal surgery or detransitioned.

Studies of transition regret or detransition in different populations have found different (average or median) elapsed times before these occurred: a 2018 study found 10 years and 10 months on average to regret (but not necessarily detransition) from start of hormonal therapy, and a 2014 study of those who had surgery found a median lag of 8 years before requesting a reversal of legal gender status. A 2021 UK study found evidence that supports detransitioning occurring on average 4–8 years after transitioning. 

Informed consent and affirmation of self-diagnosis (both newer but increasingly employed models for transgender healthcare) have been criticized for failing to meet the needs of those who eventually detransition.

Criticisms have been made regarding the "persistence-desistance" dichotomy as ignoring reasons why a person's gender identity may desist outside of simply being cisgender in the first place. For example, an assertion of a cisgender identity may be treated with validity and as an invalidation of a previously stated transgender identity; however, an assertion of a transgender identity may only be treated with the same validity if it is held throughout one's life. An individual may repress or realize their identity at any point in their life for a variety of reasons; some individuals' gender identities are fluid and/or may change throughout their lifetime, and some individuals whose identities are non-binary are effectively excluded due to a study's assumption of a gender binary.

Reasons 
The National Center for Transgender Equality conducted a survey which collected responses from individuals who identified as transgender at the time of the survey. The results published in the 2015 U.S. Transgender Survey found that 8% of respondents reported having ever detransitioned; 62% of that group reported transitioning again and were living as a gender other than the one assigned to them at birth at the time of the survey. About 36% reported having detransitioned due to pressure from parent, 33% because it was too difficult, 31% due to discrimination, 29% due to difficulty getting a job, 26% pressure from family members, 18% pressure from a spouse, and 17% due to pressure from an employer.

In a 2021 study of 237 detransitioners (92% of whom were assigned female at birth), recruited via online detransitioner communities and who no longer identify as transgender, the most prevalent reasons to detransition were the realization that gender dysphoria was related to other issues (70%), health concerns (for 62%), and that transitioning didn’t help their gender dysphoria (50%).

In a 2021 study of 2,242 individuals recruited via community outreach organizations who detransitioned and who continue to identify as transgender or gender diverse, the vast majority said detransition was in part due to external factors, such as pressure from family, sexual assault, and nonaffirming school environments; another highly cited factor was "it was just too hard for me." Motives for detransitioning commonly include financial barriers to transition, social rejection in transition, depression or suicidality due to transition, and discomfort with sexual characteristics developed during transition. Additional motives include concern for lack of data on long-term effects of hormone replacement therapy, concern for loss of fertility, complications from surgery, and changes in gender identity. Some people detransition on a temporary basis, in order to accomplish a particular aim, such as having biologically related children, or until barriers to transition have been resolved or removed. Transgender elders may also detransition out of concern for whether they can receive adequate or respectful care in later life.

A qualitative study comparing child desisters to persisters (those with persisting gender dysphoria) found that while persisters related their dysphoria primarily to a mismatch between their bodies and their identity, desisters' dysphoria was more likely to be, at least retroactively, related to a desire to fulfill the other gender role.

An October 2021 study of 100 detransitioners found that detransitioning was related to them becoming more comfortable identifying as their natal sex (60%), having concerns about potential medical complications from transitioning (49%), coming to the view that their gender dysphoria was caused by something specific such as trauma, abuse, or a mental health condition (38%), experiencing discrimination (23%), homophobia or difficulty accepting themselves as lesbian, gay, or bisexual (23%) and feeling pressured to transition by social sources that included friends, partners, and society (20%).

Forced detransition

Forced detransition of minors 
In 2021, legislatures in 22 states in the United States introduced bills that would criminalize the provision of gender-affirming care to transgender minors, forcibly detransitioning those who can't flee the state. By the end of February 2022, the number had risen to 29. Supporters of these bills often cite concerns about detransition and desistance and claim they wish to protect children. However, scientific evidence suggests these bills will cause harm to transgender children as gender-affirming care is often necessary and access to it has consistently shown a positive relationship with mental well-being.

The majority of medical associations agree that gender-affirming healthcare is necessary. The American Medical Association, American Academy of Pediatrics, and American Psychological Association have spoken out against the bills and defended the right of minors to transition. In a letter to the National Governors Association, the American Medical Association warned that anti-trans healthcare bans will lead to greater rates of depression and suicide for transgender youth and described bills banning gender-affirming care as "a dangerous intrusion into the practice of medicine". Pediatricians testifying against the bills have said they are based on myths and misconceptions about transgender healthcare.

In 2021, the Arkansas legislature passed House Bill 1570, prohibiting transgender youth from receiving gender-affirming health care of any kind. The ACLU challenged the bill, leading a federal judge to issue a temporary injunction, protecting transgender youth in the state from being detransitioned against their will.

In April 2022, Alabama Senate Bill 184 was approved. The bill prevents doctors from prescribing puberty blockers or hormone therapy for transgender youth under a threat of up to 10 years in prison, forcibly detransitioning youth in the state, and mandates that school staff out students to their parents.

On August 5, 2022, the Florida Board of Medicine voted to consider guidelines proposed by the state's surgeon general, starting the process of denying transgender youth in Florida gender-affirming care. On October 28, 2022, Florida's Board of Medicine passed a motion to ban all gender-affirming healthcare for minors, including puberty blockers, hormones, and surgeries. The motion mandates all transgender youth to detransition until they turn 18. At one point during the hearing, in response to one protester yelling that trans children would be harmed as a result, board member Dr. Zachariah P. Zachariah answered "That's okay", before forcing a vote ahead. Some who'd been at the meeting were reported as saying that the board had put all the speakers in favor of the ban, many of whom where from outside of the state or outside of the country, first in line to speak, before cutting off public comment once they ran out and pro-trans Floridians began to take the podium. The Florida Department of Health released official state guidance that transgender children should not be allowed to wear clothes or use names or pronouns aligning with their gender identity.

In Spring 2021, the Center for Christian Virtue proposed Ohio House Bill 454, known as the "Save Adolescents From Experimentation (SAFE) Act" in Ohio. The bill was introduced by state representative Gary Click in 2022 without consulting any transgender people beforehand and would forcibly detransition all transgender minors in the state. The bill would also require counselors, teachers, and all other staff at public and private schools to out transgender youth to their parents. Click stated he believes children are being "groomed" into thinking that they are trans.

In August 2022, Marjorie Taylor Greene of Georgia introduced the "Protect Children’s Innocence Act" that would make providing gender-affirming care to transgender minors a felony punishable by up to 25 years in prison and prohibit the use of federal funds for gender-affirming care, including in Affordable Care Act plans. The bill would also prohibit higher education institutions from providing instruction on gender-affirming care and bar doctor's who've provided gender-affirming care to minors from receiving visas or being admitted to the United States.

In 2023, dozens of bills in over 10 U.S. States have been proposed which would ban minors from receiving gender-affirming care.

Forced detransition of adults 
On June 2, 2022, Florida Governor Ron DeSantis announced a plan to end Medicaid coverage for transgender adults, making them the first U.S state to target hormones and transition coverage for adults and removing care for approximately 9000 adults.

In Missouri in 2022, state legislators weighed extending a youth healthcare ban to adults under 25.

As of January 13, 2023, the states of Oklahoma, South Carolina and Virginia have attempted to pass bills that would force adults to detransition. Efforts to restrict adults' access to healthcare relies heavily on claims from self-described "gender-critical" organizations such as Genspect that young people should not be recognized as adults until they turn 25.

In Oklahoma, the "Millstone act" would prohibit adults up to 25 from receiving gender-affirming care and prohibit Medicaid coverage for "gender transition procedures" for those under 26.

On March 12, 2023, a Saudi trans woman named Eden Knight died by suicide after being forcefully detransitioned. Knight wrote in a suicide note that her parents had hired an American private intelligence firm and a Saudi lawyer to relocate and forcibly socially and medically detransition her. After becoming dependent on the lawyer for food and shelter and fearing he would report her to U.S. immigration authorities, Knight wrote that she returned to her parents in Saudi Arabia. She secretly continued feminizing hormone replacement therapy, but after being found out twice she died by suicide.

Cultural and political impact 

There are no legal, medical, and psychological guidelines on the topic of detransition. The Standards of Care by the World Professional Association for Transgender Health (WPATH) do not mention detransition, though 37 WPATH surgeons have expressed a desire for detransition guidelines to be included, and former WPATH president and longtime chair of WPATH's Standards of Care revision team, Eli Coleman, has listed detransition among the topics that he would like to see included in the eighth edition.

Some researchers perceive there to be an atmosphere of censorship around studying the phenomenon. Various sides involved in the dispute over detransitioning say they have been harassed and have described each other as threats to transgender rights. A study in 2021 involving detransitioners found that many of them felt they lost support from the LGBT+ community and friends.

Controversy surrounding detransition within trans activism primarily arises from how the subject is framed as a subject of moral panic in mainstream media and right-wing politics. Detransition has attracted interest from both social conservatives on the political right and radical feminists on the political left. Activists on the right have been accused of using detransitioners' stories to further their work against trans rights. On the left, some radical feminists see detransitioners' experiences as further proof of patriarchal enforcement of gender roles and medicalized erasure of gays and lesbians. Other feminists have expressed disagreement with this opinion, referring to those who hold these beliefs as trans-exclusionary radical feminists (TERF). This attention has elicited in detransitioners mixed feelings of both exploitation and support.

In August 2017, the Mazzoni Center's Philadelphia Trans Health Conference, which is an annual meeting of transgender people, advocates, and healthcare providers, canceled two panel discussions on detransition and alternate methods of working with gender dysphoria. The conference organizers said, "When a topic becomes controversial, such as this one has turned on social media, there is a duty to make sure that the debate does not get out of control at the conference itself. After several days of considerations and reviewing feedback, the planning committee voted that the workshops, while valid, cannot be presented at the conference as planned."

In September 2017, Bath Spa University revoked permission for James Caspian, a Jungian psychotherapist who works with transgender people and is a trustee of the Beaumont Trust, to research regret of gender-reassignment procedures and pursuit of detransition. Caspian alleged the reason for the university's refusal was that it was "a potentially politically incorrect piece of research, [which] carries a risk to the university. Attacks on social media may not be confined to the researcher, but may involve the university. The posting of unpleasant material on blogs or social media may be detrimental to the reputation of the university." The university stated that Caspian's proposal "was not refused because of the subject matter, but rather because of his proposed methodological approach. The university was not satisfied this approach would guarantee the anonymity of his participants or the confidentiality of the data."  In May 2017, he took the matter to the High Court, which concluded his application for a judicial review was "totally without merit".  The outcome was also considered by the Office of the Independent Adjudicator for Higher Education, who determined the university's conclusion was reasonable. Caspian appealed to the High Court for judicial review again in 2019; the judge ruled against him, saying, "I entirely accept that there are important issues of freedom of expression. I just do not accept that, on the facts of this particular case, there is an arguable case made out," and adding that the application was too late. Caspian claimed that he was "refused permission for a Judicial Review on points of procedure" and that the judge "was clearly sympathetic to the case but felt that his hands were tied by legal procedure;" in February 2021, he appealed to the European Court of Human Rights.

Many ex-gay and Christian Right affiliated organizations also offer services to transgender people, either through themselves or partner organizations. A key characteristic of these organizations are the construction of "transgenderism" as a sin against God or the natural order. In the 1970's, Exodus International platformed Perry Desmond, an "ex-transsexual" who evangelized throughout the US and supported Anita Bryant's Save Our Children campaign. Another prominent characteristic is ex-transgender testimonials, which depict "the transgender lifestyle" as destructive as opposed to contemplation of God and encourage other transgender people to join them. These organizations portray "gender ideology" and "transgender ideology" as a social contagion threatening to the natural order.

Ky Schevers, an "ex-detransitioner" whose detransition was prominently profiled by Katie Herzog and The Outline, spoke about her experiences in a community of radical feminist detransitioned women, drawing parallels to the ex-gay movement and conversion therapy. Parallels drawn include suppressing rather than addressing or removing the underlying dysphoria, stating that not only their gender dysphoria but everyone's dysphoria was a result of internalized sexism and trauma, and language from the twelve-step program being used to describe the desire to transition.

Schevers noted that during the Bell v Tavistock ruling, her lawyer had connections to the right-wing and anti-LGBT-rights organization the Alliance Defending Freedom, which she described as pushing most of the anti-trans bills in the United States. Schevers later created Health Liberation Now! alongside Lee Leveille, who'd also previously been involved in detransition communities that were transphobic, to "give voice to folks who have complicated experiences with transition or detransition, retransition and shifting senses of self that goes beyond a lot of the TERFy areas that people are inevitably getting funnelled into". The group has reported on conversion therapy practices and maintains resources to help identify relationships between clinical conversion therapists and astroturfed campaigns led by anti-trans groups.

See also

 :Category:People who detransitioned
 Healthcare and the LGBT community
 LGBT rights by country or territory
 LGBT social movements

References

Sources

Books

Journal articles

News

Online sources

Further reading

Gender identity
Transgender
LGBT terminology